Lawrence Okoroafor (born 10 January 1939) is a Nigerian sprinter. He competed in the men's 4 × 100 metres relay at the 1964 Summer Olympics.

References

1939 births
Living people
Athletes (track and field) at the 1964 Summer Olympics
Nigerian male sprinters
Olympic athletes of Nigeria
Place of birth missing (living people)